Lux Noctis is the first full-length studio album by German gothic metal band Coronatus, released in 2007.

Reception

A review by Sonic Seducer called the album "halfbaked" due to unbalanced vocal sets, but lauded the overall quality of the production. The Austrian Stormbringer webzine was equally positive about the production but found the contrasting female voices to be a unique and positive asset of the band. The German edition of Metal Hammer compared the style to Nightwish and awarded three out of seven points in its rating.

Petőfi Csarnok of Kultura.hu said "Lux Noctis album has one of last year's best female vocals".

Track listing

Personnel
Carmen R. Schäfer – vocals
Viola Schuch – vocals
Wolfgang Nillies – guitars
Fabian Merkt – keyboards & programming
Stefan Häfele – bass
Mats Kurth – drums

Info
Mastered by Mika Jussila at Finnvox Studios in Helsinki, Finland.

References

2007 albums
Coronatus albums
Massacre Records albums